Paratylopus is an extinct genus of camelid, endemic to North America. Fossils have been found in western Wyoming, and from eastern Nebraska to northeastern Colorado and southwestern South Dakota.

References

Prehistoric camelids
Eocene even-toed ungulates
Oligocene even-toed ungulates
Rupelian genus extinctions
Paleogene mammals of North America
Prehistoric even-toed ungulate genera